GPISD can refer to the following Texas school districts:

 Grand Prairie Independent School District (Dallas-Fort Worth area)
 Galena Park Independent School District (Houston area)
 Gregory-Portland Independent School District (Corpus Christi area)